Hexafluoropropylene is the fluoroalkene with the formula CF3CF=CF2. It is the perfluorocarbon  counterpart to the hydrocarbon propylene. It is mainly used to produce copolymers with tetrafluoroethylene. Hexafluoropropylene is used as a chemical intermediate.

Preparation
Hexafluoropropylene can be produced by pyrolysis of tetrafluoroethylene: 
3CF2=CF2  →  2CF3CF=CF2
It can also be prepared from chlorodifluoromethane, or produced from various chlorofluorocarbons.

References

Fluorocarbons
Haloalkenes